Events from the year 1731 in Great Britain.

Incumbents
 Monarch – George II
 Prime Minister – Robert Walpole (Whig)
 Parliament – 7th

Events
 16 March – Treaty of Vienna signed between the Holy Roman Empire, Great Britain, the Dutch Republic and Spain.
 April – trader Robert Jenkins has his ear cut off by Spanish coast guards in Cuba, casus belli for the War of Jenkins' Ear in 1739.
 28 April – a fire at White's Chocolate House, near St. James's Palace in London, destroys the historic club and the paintings therein, but is kept from spreading by the fast response of firemen.
 4 June – great fire destroys much of the centre of Blandford Forum, Dorset.
 5 June – Tiverton fire of 1731, a great fire in Tiverton, Devon.
 23 August – the oldest known sports score in history is recorded in the description of a cricket match at Richmond Green, when the team of Thomas Chambers of Middlesex defeats the Duke of Richmond's team by 119 to 79.
 September – the first successful appendectomy is performed by surgeon William Cookesley.
 30 September – the village of Barnwell, Cambridgeshire, is "burned down entirely" by a fire.
 23 October – fire at Ashburnham House in London damages the nationally owned Cotton library, housed there at this time.

Undated
 Proceedings in Courts of Justice Act 1730: Legal proceedings in the courts to be conducted in the English language.
 William Hogarth produces his A Harlot's Progress series of paintings.
 John Bevis observes the Crab Nebula for the first time in the modern era.

Publications
 1 January – first edition of The Gentleman's Magazine published by Edward Cave.
 Jethro Tull's treatise The New Horse-Houghing Husbandry; or, an essay on the principles of tillage and vegetation.

Births
 4 February – Mary Deverell, religious writer, essayist and poet (died 1805)
 10 February – Thomas Beckwith, English painter, genealogist and antiquary (died 1786)
 8 May – Beilby Porteus, Bishop of London and abolitionist (died 1809)
 August – Henry Constantine Jennings, collector of antiquities and gambler (died 1819)
 10 October – Henry Cavendish, scientist (died 1810)
 15 November – William Cowper, poet (died 1800)
 12 December – Erasmus Darwin, physician and scientist, grandfather of Charles Darwin (died 1802)
 date unknown – William Aiton, Scottish botanist (died 1793)

Deaths
 10 February – George Carpenter, 1st Baron Carpenter, Army general (born 1657)
 24 April – Daniel Defoe, writer (born 1660)
 11 May – Mary Astell, feminist writer (born 1666)
 17 May – Samuel Bradford, churchman and Whig politician (born 1652)
 20 June – Ned Ward, writer and publican (born 1667)
 18 July – Sir Walter Yonge, 3rd Baronet, politician (born 1653)
 24 August – William Godolphin, Marquess of Blandford, nobleman (born c. 1699)
 17 December – George Lockhart, Scottish writer, spy and politician, killed in duel (born 1673)
 29 December – Brook Taylor, mathematician (born 1685)

References

 
Years in Great Britain